The Camp Grant massacre, on April 30, 1871, was an attack on Pinal and Aravaipa Apaches who surrendered to the United States Army at Camp Grant, Arizona, along the San Pedro River. The massacre led to a series of battles and campaigns fought between the Americans, the Apache, and their Yavapai allies, which continued into 1875, the most notable being General George Crook's Tonto Basin Campaign of 1872 and 1873.

Background

Some historians feel the reduction of Indian hostilities in the region had triggered fears of economic crisis in Tucson, since the Federal government was reducing funds for pacifying and controlling hostile tribes, mostly Apaches. Merchants who survived on the "blankets for peace" economy, were afraid their source of income would soon be lost.
In early 1871, to bolster public support for increased hostilities and increased federal funding of "gifts" to the Apaches, several Arizonans allegedly staged mock raids on isolated settlements. One of these settlements was in Aravaipa Canyon.

Indian affairs in early 1870s Arizona lurched back and forth between peace and war. Each new round of hostilities brought increasing conflict between the settlers and the soldiers. The report of the Indian Peace Commission, in 1867, led to the creation of the Board of Indian Commissioners two years later. Investigating abuses within the Office of Indian Affairs, the commissioners spearheaded a growing movement for Indian rights that culminated in the Quaker Policy of President Ulysses S. Grant's administration.

A major problem faced by Arizona's military was they had too few soldiers for too vast an area of land. Most chronicles of the time regarded Apaches as the biggest menace, but Yuman-speaking Yavapais, who were often identified as Apache Mohaves or Apache Yumas, killed and mutilated settlers just as often. Divided into four subtribes, the Tolkapaya, or Western Yavapais, the Yavepe and the Wipukpaya or Northeastern Yavapais and the Kewevkapaya or Southeastern Yavapais, the Yavapais ranged from the Colorado River to the Tonto Basin. Like the Apaches, they were mobile and extremely independent, their only political authorities being war chiefs and advisory chiefs selected by local groups. This made it extremely difficult for the United States Army to run down or negotiate with more than one Yavapai group at a time. Troops had to pursue the Yavapais across rough desert terrain. Many of the soldiers deserted, fleeing places like Camp Grant, a sun-scorched collection of adobe buildings.

Camp Grant
Early in 1871, a 37-year-old first lieutenant named Royal Emerson Whitman assumed command of Camp Grant, Arizona Territory, about 50 miles (80 km) northeast of Tucson. In February 1871, five old Apache women straggled into Camp Grant to look for a son who had been taken prisoner. Whitman fed them and treated them kindly, so other Apaches from Aravaipa and Pinal bands soon came to the post to receive rations of beef and flour. That spring, Whitman created a refuge along Aravaipa Creek, about five miles (8 km) east of Camp Grant for nearly 500 Aravaipa and Pinal Apaches, including Chief Eskiminzin. The Apaches began cutting hay for the post's horses and harvesting barley in nearby ranchers' fields.

Whitman may have suspected that peace could not last. He urged Eskiminzin to move his people to the White Mountains near Fort Apache, which was established in 1870, but he refused. During the winter and spring, William S. Oury and Jesús María Elías formed a vigilante group, the Committee of Public Safety, which blamed every depredation in southern Arizona on the Camp Grant Apaches. After Apaches ran off livestock from San Xavier on April 10, Elías contacted his old ally Francisco Galerita, leader of the Tohono O'odham at San Xavier. Oury collected arms and ammunition from his followers.

Massacre
On the afternoon of April 28, six Anglo Americans, 48 Mexican Americans, and 92 Tohono O'odham gathered along Rillito Creek and set off on a march to Aravaipa Canyon; one of the Americans was William S. Oury, the brother of Granville Henderson Oury. At dawn on Sunday, April 30, they surrounded the Apache camp. The O'odham were the main fighters, while the Americans and Mexicans picked off Apaches who tried to escape. Most of the Apache men were off hunting in the mountains. All but eight of the corpses were women and children. Twenty-nine children had been captured and were sold into slavery in Mexico by the Tohono O'odham and the Mexicans themselves. A total of 144 Aravaipas and Pinals had been killed and mutilated, nearly all of them scalped.

Aftermath
Lieutenant Whitman searched for the wounded, found only one woman, buried the bodies, and dispatched interpreters into the mountains to find the Apache men and assure them his soldiers had not participated in the "vile transaction". The following evening, the surviving Aravaipas began trickling back to Camp Grant. Many of the settlers in southern Arizona considered the attack justifiable homicide and agreed with Oury, but this was not the end of the story.

Within a week of the slaughter, a local businessman, William Hopkins Tonge, wrote to the Commissioner of Indian Affairs stating, "The Indians at the time of the massacre being so taken by surprise and considering themselves perfectly safe with scarcely any arms, those that could get away ran for the mountains." He was the first person to refer to what had taken place as a massacre.

The military and the Eastern press called it a massacre, so President Grant informed Governor A.P.K. Safford that if the perpetrators were not brought to trial, he would place Arizona under martial law. In October 1871, a Tucson grand jury indicted 100 of the assailants with 108 counts of murder. The trial, two months later, focused solely on Apache depredations; it took the jury just 19 minutes to pronounce a verdict of not guilty. Western Apache groups soon left their farms and gathering places near Tucson in fear of subsequent attacks. As pioneer families arrived and settled in the area, Apaches were never able to regain hold of much of their ancestral lands in the San Pedro River Valley. Many groups of Apaches joined up with the Yavapais in Tonto Basin, and from there, a guerilla war began which lasted until 1875.

Site of Camp Grant and the massacre
The massacre occurred in the vicinity of Camp Grant.  In 1871, its location was on an upper terrace on the east bank of the San Pedro River, just north of the junction with Araviapa Creek. The camp was in the vicinity of 32°50'51.22"N, 110°42'11.91"W.  The Camp Grant site was near the present Aravaipa Campus of Central Arizona Community College, which is located between the towns of Mammoth and Winkelman on Arizona State Route 77. Few remains of the site are visible.

Current authorities place the massacre site south of the Aravaipa Creek and about five miles upstream from Camp Grant. No marker is at the site of the massacre, and the location is only generally known.

Descendants of those massacred are in 2021 fighting in opposition to the siting of a massive copper mine at Oak Flat, proximate to the massacre site.

Sources
 Leighton, David. 2013. "Street Smarts: Adventurous life led Oury here, "Arizona Daily Star, July 23, 2013 Street Smarts: Adventurous life led Oury here
 
 
 Colwell-Chanthaphonh, Chip. 2007. Massacre at Camp Grant: Forgetting and Remembering Apache History. University of Arizona Press, Tucson.
 Colwell-Chanthaphonh, Chip. 2003. The Camp Grant Massacre in the Historical Imagination. Journal of the Southwest 45(3):249–69.
 Colwell-Chanthaphonh, Chip. 2003. Western Apache Oral Histories and Traditions of the Camp Grant Massacre. American Indian Quarterly 27(3&4):639–66.
 Hammond, George P. 1929. The Camp Grant Massacre: A Chapter in Apache History. Berkeley: Proceedings of the Pacific Coast Branch of the American Historical Association.
 Hastings, James E. 1959. The Tragedy at Camp Grant in 1871. Arizona and the West 1(2):146–60
 Langellier, J. Phillip. 1979. Camp Grant Affair, 1871: Milestone in Federal Indian Policy? Military History of Texas and the Southwest 15(2):17–30.
 Beal, Tom. 2009. "Curing 'amnesia' about state's most blood-soaked day", Arizona Daily Star, May 3, 2009 Curing 'amnesia' about state's most blood-soaked day

See also

 List of massacres in Arizona
 Camp Grant, Arizona

References

Conflicts in 1871
Arizona Territory
Massacres of Native Americans
Western Apache
Battles involving the Apache
San Pedro Valley (Arizona)
Massacres by Native Americans
Apache Wars
1871 in Arizona Territory
April 1871 events